The General Israel Putnam House in Danvers, Massachusetts, United States, is a historic First Period house recorded in the National Register of Historic Places. The house is also sometimes known as the  Thomas Putnam House after Lt. Thomas Putnam (1615–1686), who built the home circa 1648. His grandson, Israel Putnam, the famous general of the American Revolution, was born in the house.  Lt. Thomas Putnam was the father of Sgt. Thomas Putnam Jr., (Israel's half-uncle), a notorious figure in the Salem witch trials. The Putnam House is now owned by the Emerson Family, the same owners of Putnam Pantry.

Description
In 1692, Joseph Putnam, the resident of the house at that time, spoke out against the hysteria of the Salem witch trials. His son, Major General Israel Putnam, commander of the colonial troops at the Battle of Bunker Hill, was born in the house on January 7, 1718. In 1991, the Putnam family descendants gave the property to the Danvers Historical Society.

The original house has been augmented by repeated additions. Today, it consists of an irregular 2½ story frame structure, with clapboards and with a pitch roof over one part of the house and gambrel roof over another. It is located at 431 Maple Street, behind Putnam Pantry, a candy and ice cream shop opened by the family on U.S. Route 1.

Gallery

See also
 List of historic houses in Massachusetts
 List of the oldest buildings in Massachusetts
 National Register of Historic Places listings in Essex County, Massachusetts

References

External links 
 Putnam House (Danvers Historical Society, historic houses)

Historic house museums in Massachusetts
Museums in Danvers, Massachusetts
Houses in Danvers, Massachusetts
Houses completed in 1648
Houses on the National Register of Historic Places in Essex County, Massachusetts
1648 establishments in Massachusetts
First period houses in Massachusetts (1620–1659)